Myrrha (minor planet designation: 381 Myrrha) is a main-belt asteroid that was discovered by the French astronomer Auguste Charlois on January 10, 1894, in Nice. It has been classified as a C-type asteroid and is most likely composed of carbonaceous material.

Photometric observations of this asteroid at the Oakley Observatory in Terre Haute, Indiana during 2006 gave a light curve with a period of 6.572 ± 0.002 hours and a brightness variation of 0.34 ± 0.05 in magnitude.

10μ radiometric data collected from Kitt Peak in 1975 gave a diameter estimate of 126 km. The occultation of Alhena (γ Geminorum) by Myrrha was observed in Japan and China on January 13, 1991, allowing the size and shape of Myrrha to be properly clarified.

References

External links
 The occultation of gamma Geminorum by the asteroid 381 Myrrha
 
 

Background asteroids
Myrrha
Myrrha
C-type asteroids (Tholen)
Cb-type asteroids (SMASS)
18940110